The 2012–13 Indiana Pacers season was 46th season of the franchise and 37th season in the National Basketball Association (NBA). The regular season ended with a 49–32 win–loss record; the team only played 81 games due to a game versus the Boston Celtics being cancelled following the Boston Marathon bombing. The Pacers advanced to their first Conference Finals in nine years after defeating the Atlanta Hawks and New York Knicks, each in six games. In the Conference Finals, they fell to the defending champion Miami Heat in seven games. The Heat would go on to win its third NBA championship and second straight overall after defeating the San Antonio Spurs in a seven-game NBA Finals series.

The season was the first since 1998–99 without Jeff Foster, who retired after 2011–12 season.

Key dates
 June 28: The 2012 NBA draft took place at Prudential Center in Newark, New Jersey.

2012 NBA draft

Roster

Pre-season

|- style="background:#fcc;"
| 1
| October 10
| @ Minnesota
| 
| Paul George (16)
| Tyler Hansbrough (7)
| Four players (2)
| Fargodome9,163
| 0–1
|- style="background:#bfb;"
| 2
| October 12
| Minnesota
| 
| Paul George (19)
| Ian Mahinmi (8)
| Ben Hansbrough (7)
| Bankers Life Fieldhouse10,794
| 1–1
|- style="background:#bfb;"
| 3
| October 16
| Atlanta
| 
| Paul George (20)
| Roy Hibbert (11)
| Paul George, Ben Hansbrough (4)
| Bankers Life Fieldhouse10,786
| 2–1
|- style="background:#fcc;"
| 4
| October 19
| @ Orlando
| 
| Tyler Hansbrough (23)
| Paul George (7)
| Sundiata Gaines, Lance Stephenson (3)
| Amway Center17,204
| 2–2
|- style="background:#bfb;"
| 5
| October 20
| Memphis
| 
| Gerald Green (18)
| Tyler Hansbrough (13)
| Paul George (3)
| Bankers Life Fieldhouse13,399
| 3–2
|- style="background:#bfb;"
| 6
| October 23
| @ Cleveland
| 
| Paul George (14)
| David West (8)
| D. J. Augustin (11)
| Quicken Loans Arena10,040
| 4–2
|- style="background:#fcc;"
| 7
| October 26
| @ Chicago
| 
| Roy Hibbert (17)
| Paul George (10)
| D. J. Augustin (13)
| United Center9,149
| 4–3

Regular season

Game log
Note: the Indiana Pacers only played 81 games due to the cancellation of the April 16, 2013 game vs the Boston Celtics.

|- style="background:#cfc;"
| 1 || October 31 || @ Toronto
| 
| David West (25)
| Paul George (15)
| George Hill (7)
| Air Canada Centre19,800
| 1–0

|- style="background:#fcc;"
| 2 || November 2 || @ Charlotte
| 
| Hansbrough & Stephenson (15)
| Ian Mahinmi (8)
| Paul George (6)
| Time Warner Cable Arena19,124
| 1–1
|- style="background:#cfc;"
| 3 || November 3 || Sacramento
| 
| Hill & West (18)
| David West (18)
| George Hill (5)
| Bankers Life Fieldhouse18,165
| 2–1
|- style="background:#fcc;"
| 4 || November 5 || @ San Antonio
| 
| George Hill (15)
| David West (11)
| George Hill (6)
| AT&T Center17,158
| 2–2
|- style="background:#fcc;"
| 5 || November 7 || @ Atlanta
| 
| Hill & West (20)
| George & Hibbert (7)
| George Hill (5)
| Philips Arena10,684
| 2–3
|- style="background:#fcc;"
| 6 || November 9 || @ Minnesota
| 
| George Hill (29)
| David West (13)
| George Hill (7)
| Target Center18,222
| 2–4       
|- style="background:#cfc;"       
| 7 || November 10 || Washington
| 
| Paul George (20)
| Roy Hibbert (12)
| George Hill (5)
| Bankers Life Fieldhouse12,036
| 3–4       
|- style="background:#fcc;"       
| 8 || November 13 || Toronto
| 
| George Hill (18)
| George & Hibbert (9)
| Paul George (4)
| Bankers Life Fieldhouse11,947
| 3–5       
|- style="background:#fcc;"       
| 9 || November 14 || @ Milwaukee
| 
| Tyler Hansbrough (17)
| David West (9)
| Hill & Stephenson (4)
| BMO Harris Bradley Center11,573
| 3–6       
|- style="background:#cfc;"       
| 10 || November 16 || Dallas
| 
| Hill & West (15)
| Roy Hibbert (8)
| George Hill (7)
| Bankers Life Fieldhouse15,110
| 4–6       
|- style="background:#fcc;"       
| 11 || November 18 || @ New York
| 
| Paul George (20)
| Hansbrough & Hibbert (8)
| George Hill (6)
| Madison Square Garden19,033
| 4–7       
|- style="background:#cfc;"       
| 12 || November 19 || @ Washington
| 
| David West (30)
| Hibbert (12)
| George Hill (5)
| Verizon Center14,426
| 5–7       
|- style="background:#cfc;"       
| 13 || November 21 || New Orleans
| 
| Paul George (37)
| Roy Hibbert (11)
| George Hill (7)
| Bankers Life Fieldhouse12,633
| 6–7       
|- style="background:#fcc;"       
| 14 || November 23 || San Antonio
| 
| David West (22)
| Tyler Hansbrough (12)
| D. J. Augustin (8)
| Bankers Life Fieldhouse17,082
| 6–8       
|- style="background:#cfc;"      
| 15 || November 27 || @ L. A. Lakers
| 
| George Hill (19)
| David West (10)
| David West (8)
| Staples Center18,997
| 7–8      
|- style="background:#cfc;"       
| 16 || November 30 || @ Sacramento
| 
| David West (31)
| David West (11)
| Paul George (9)
| Sleep Train Arena12,544
| 8–8  

|- style="background:#fcc;"    
| 17 || December 1 || @ Golden State
| 
| David West (23)
| David West (8)
| George, Stephenson,& West (4)
| Oracle Arena18,623
| 8–9       
|- style="background:#cfc;"       
| 18 || December 4 || @ Chicago
| 
| Paul George (34)
| Roy Hibbert (11)
| West & Hill (5)
| United Center21,252
| 9–9       
|- style="background:#cfc;"       
| 19 || December 5 || Portland
| 
| Paul George (22)
| David West (10)
| Paul George (5)
| Bankers Life Fieldhouse11,569
| 10–9       
|- style="background:#fcc;"       
| 20 || December 7 || Denver
| 
| Paul George (22)
| David West (11)
| George Hill (10)
| Bankers Life Fieldhouse15,289
| 10–10       
|- style="background:#fcc;"
| 21 || December 9 || @ Oklahoma City
| 
| David West (21)
| David West (9)
| George & Hill (3)
| Chesapeake Energy Arena18,203
| 10–11
|- style="background:#cfc;"
| 22 || December 12 || Cleveland
| 
| Paul George (27)
| Roy Hibbert (12)
| David West (7)
| Bankers Life Fieldhouse11,595
| 11–11
|- style="background:#cfc;"       
| 23 || December 14 || Philadelphia
| 
| Paul George (28)
| Roy Hibbert (13)
| George Hill (10)
| Bankers Life Fieldhouse13,538
| 12–11       
|- style="background:#cfc;"       
| 24 || December 15 || @ Detroit
| 
| David West (23)
| Paul George (8)
| Paul George (8)
| The Palace of Auburn Hills13,235
| 13–11       
|- style="background:#fcc;"       
| 25 || December 18 || @ Milwaukee
| 
| George Hill (18)
| George & Hibbert (10)
| Paul George (5)
| BMO Harris Bradley Center11,739
| 13–12       
|- style="background:#cfc;"       
| 26 || December 19 || Utah
| 
| Gerald Green (21)
| Paul George (11)
| George Hill (5)
| Bankers Life Fieldhouse13,559
| 14–12       
|- style="background:#cfc;"       
| 27 || December 21 || @ Cleveland
| 
| Roy Hibbert (18)
| David West (10)
| Lance Stephenson (7)
| Quicken Loans Arena14,105
| 15–12       
|- style="background:#cfc;"       
| 28 || December 22 || @ New Orleans
| 
| David West (25)
| Paul George (12)
| George Hill (6)
| New Orleans Arena15,042
| 16–12       
|- style="background:#cfc;"      
| 29 || December 28 || Phoenix
| 
| George Hill (22)
| Roy Hibbert (14)
| Lance Stephenson (5)
| Bankers Life Fieldhouse15,288
| 17–12       
|- style="background:#fcc;"       
| 30 || December 29 || @ Atlanta
| 
| David West (29)
| Tyler Hansbrough (9)
| Paul George (8)
| Philips Arena16,558
| 17–13       
|- style="background:#cfc;"       
| 31 || December 31 || Memphis
| 
| Paul George (21)
| David West (9)
| D. J. Augustin (6)
| Bankers Life Fieldhouse14,979
| 18–13       

|- style="background:#cfc;"      
| 32 || January 2 || Washington
| 
| Paul George (29)
| Paul George (14)
| D. J. Augustin (6)
| Bankers Life Fieldhouse11,182
| 19–13       
|- style="background:#fcc;"       
| 33 || January 4 || @ Boston
| 
| Tyler Hansbrough (19)
| Hibbert & West (10)
| Augustin & George (4)
| TD Garden18,624
| 19–14       
|- style="background:#cfc;"       
| 34 || January 5 || Milwaukee
| 
| Roy Hibbert (20)
| Roy Hibbert (15)
| George & Hill (4)
| Bankers Life Fieldhouse15,329
| 20–14       
|- style="background:#cfc;"       
| 35 || January 8 || Miami
| 
| Paul George (29)
| Roy Hibbert (14)
| D. J. Augustin (8)
| Bankers Life Fieldhouse18,165
| 21–14  
|- style="background:#cfc;"       
| 36 || January 10 || New York
| 
| Paul George (29)
| Paul George (11)
| Paul George (5)
| Bankers Life Fieldhouse16,568
| 22–14     
|- style="background: #cfc;"       
| 37 || January 12 || Charlotte
| 
| George Hill (19)
| David West (12)
| David West (10)
| Bankers Life Fieldhouse13,656
| 23–14       
|- style="background:#fcc;"       
| 38 || January 13 || @ Brooklyn
| 
| David West (27)
| Paul George (12)
| D. J. Augustin (4)
| Barclays Center16,499
| 23–15       
|- style="background:#cfc;"       
| 39 || January 15 || @ Charlotte
| 
| Roy Hibbert (18)
| Paul George (10)
| Lance Stephenson (6)
| Time Warner Cable Arena12,996
| 24–15
|- style="background:#fcc;"
| 40 || January 16 || @ Orlando
| 
| Paul George (20)
| Paul George (10)
| George Hill (6)
| Amway Center17,499
| 24–16
|- style="background:#cfc;"
| 41 || January 18 || Houston
| 
| Paul George (31)
| David West (11)
| David West (7)
| Bankers Life Fieldhouse16,902
| 25–16
|- style="background:#cfc;"
| 42 || January 21 || @ Memphis
| 
| David West (14)
| Paul George (10)
| Paul George (9)
| FedExForum17,508
| 26–16       
|- style="background:#fcc;"       
| 43 || January 23 || @ Portland
| 
| Paul George (22)
| George & West (7)
| Hill, Stephenson,& West (3)
| Rose Garden18,934
| 26–17       
|- style="background:#fcc;"       
| 44 || January 26 || @ Utah
| 
| David West (24)
| Roy Hibbert (12)
| George Hill (8)
| EnergySolutions Arena19,201
| 26–18       
|- style="background:#fcc;"       
| 45 || January 28 || @ Denver
| 
| Paul George (23)
| Roy Hibbert (11)
| George Hill (6)
| Pepsi Center16,032
| 26–19       
|- style="background:#cfc;"       
| 46 || January 30 || Detroit
| 
| Roy Hibbert (18)
| Hansbrough, Hibbert,& Stephenson (11)
| Lance Stephenson (5)
| Bankers Life Fieldhouse12,137
| 27–19
       
|- style="background:#cfc;"       
| 47 || February 1 || Miami
| 
| David West (30)
| David West (7)
| Paul George (6)
| Bankers Life Fieldhouse18,165
| 28–19    
|- style="background:#cfc;"       
| 48 || February 4|| Chicago
| 
| David West (29)
| Paul George (11)
| George Hill (6)
| Bankers Life Fieldhouse18,165
| 29–19
|- style="background:#cfc;"       
| 49 || February 5 || Atlanta
| 
| Paul George (29)
| Roy Hibbert (8)
| George Hill (8)
| Bankers Life Fieldhouse12,578
| 30–19       
|- style="background:#cfc;"       
| 50 || February 6 || @ Philadelphia
| 
| Roy Hibbert (18)
| Roy Hibbert (14)
| Paul George (6)
| Wells Fargo Center15,299
| 31–19       
|- style="background:#fcc;"
| 51 || February 8 || Toronto
| 
| David West (30)
| Paul George (14)
| George & Hill (5)
| Bankers Life Fieldhouse16,253
| 31–20
|- style="background:#fcc;"
| 52 || February 11 || Brooklyn
| 
| George Hill (22)
| Roy Hibbert (10)
| George Hill (6)
| Bankers Life Fieldhouse11,672
| 31–21
|- style="background:#cfc;"        
| 53 || February 13 || Charlotte
| 
| Paul George (23)
| Paul George (12)
| Paul George (12)
| Bankers Life Fieldhouse11,707
| 32–21
|- align="center"
|colspan="9" bgcolor="#bbcaff"|All-Star Break
|- style="background:#cfc;"        
| 54 || February 20 || New York
| 
| Paul George (27)
| David West (9)
| George Hill (5)
| Bankers Life Fieldhouse16,123
| 33–21       
|- style="background:#cfc;"        
| 55 || February 22 || Detroit
| 
| David West (18)
| David West (8)
| George Hill (6)
| Bankers Life Fieldhouse17,750
| 34–21 
|- style="background:#cfc;"       
| 56 || February 23 || @ Detroit
| 
| George Hill (17)
| Paul George (12)
| Paul George (8)
| The Palace of Auburn Hills17,509
| 35–21      
|- style="background:#cfc;"        
| 57 || February 26 || Golden State
| 
| David West (28)
| Paul George (11)
| George Hill (7)
| Bankers Life Fieldhouse14,426
| 36–21       
|- style="background:#fcc;"       
| 58 || February 28 || L. A. Clippers
| 
| David West (22)
| Lance Stephenson (7)
| Paul George (5)
| Bankers Life Fieldhouse18,165
| 36–22
        
|- style="background:#cfc;"      
| 59 || March 1 || @ Toronto
| 
| Paul George (22)
| David West (11)
| D. J. Augustin (7)
| Air Canada Centre18,268
| 37–22     
|- style="background:#cfc;"        
| 60 || March 3 || Chicago
| 
| David West (31)
| George & Hibbert (10)
| Paul George (6)
| Bankers Life Fieldhouse17,533
| 38–22      
|- style="background:#fcc;"        
| 61 || March 6 || Boston
| 
| Paul George (16)
| Roy Hibbert (16)
| David West (4)
| Bankers Life Fieldhouse17,833
| 38–23      
|- style="background:#cfc;"        
| 62 || March 8 || @ Orlando
| 
| Paul George (25)
| David West (7)
| D. J. Augustin (8)
| Amway Center16,515
| 39–23      
|- style="background:#fcc;"        
| 63 || March 10 || @ Miami
| 
| David West (24)
| Paul George (6)
| Paul George (5)
| American Airlines Arena20,219
| 39–24
|- style="background:#cfc;"       
| 64 || March 13 || Minnesota
| 
| Roy Hibbert (27)
| Roy Hibbert (12)
| David West (6)
| Bankers Life Fieldhouse14,187
| 40–24
|- style="background:#fcc;"       
| 65 || March 15 || L. A. Lakers
| 
| George Hill (27)
| Lance Stephenson (11)
| Lance Stephenson (5)
| Bankers Life Fieldhouse18,165
| 40–25
|- style="background:#fcc;"        
| 66 || March 16 || @ Philadelphia
| 
| Roy Hibbert (25)
| Paul George (14)
| Paul George (8)
| Wells Fargo Center18,587
| 40–26       
|- style="background:#cfc;"        
| 67 || March 18 || @ Cleveland
| 
| Gerald Green (20)
| Tyler Hansbrough (11)
| George Hill (7)
| Quicken Loans Arena13,016
| 41–26       
|- style="background:#cfc;"       
| 68 || March 19 || Orlando
| 
| Paul George (19)
| Tyler Hansbrough (14)
| Orlando Johnson (5)
| Bankers Life Fieldhouse14,343
| 42–26
|- style="background:#cfc;"       
| 69 || March 22 || Milwaukee
| 
| Tyler Hansbrough (22)
| Tyler Hansbrough (12)
| Paul George (6)
| Bankers Life Fieldhouse18,165
| 43–26
|- style="background:#fcc;"        
| 70 || March 23 || @ Chicago
| 
| Paul George (23)
| Roy Hibbert (12)
| Tyler Hansbrough (3)
| United Center22,494
| 43–27
|- style="background:#cfc;"        
| 71 || March 25 || Atlanta
| 
| Gerald Green (19)
| Roy Hibbert (13)
| D. J. Augustin (5)
| Bankers Life Fieldhouse14,336
| 44–27       
|- style="background:#cfc;"        
| 72 || March 27 || @ Houston
| 
| Roy Hibbert (28)
| Roy Hibbert (13)
| George Hill (5)
| Toyota Center18,134
| 45–27     
|- style="background:#cfc;"        
| 73 || March 28 || @ Dallas
| 
| Paul George (24)
| Roy Hibbert (11)
| Paul George (6)
| American Airlines Center20,037
| 46–27      
|- style="background:#cfc;"       
| 74 || March 30 || @ Phoenix
| 
| Paul George (25)
| David West (7)
| Paul George &David West (4)
| US Airways Center17,090
| 47–27

|- style="background:#cfc;"       
| 75 || April 1 || @ L. A. Clippers
| 
| Roy Hibbert (26)
| Roy Hibbert (10)
| Paul George (10)
| Staples Center19,384
| 48–27
|- style="background:#fcc;"      
| 76 || April 5 || Oklahoma City
| 
| Roy Hibbert (22)
| Roy Hibbert (8)
| Stephenson & Hill (3)
| Bankers Life Fieldhouse18,165
| 48–28
|- style="background:#fcc;"     
| 77 || April 6 || @ Washington
| 
| Roy Hibbert (25)
| David West (10)
| Paul George & Hill (3)
| Verizon Center19,360
| 48–29
|- style="background:#cfc;"       
| 78 || April 9 || Cleveland
| 
| George Hill (27)
| David West (9)
| George Hill (4)
| Bankers Life Fieldhouse15,279
| 49–29
|- style="background:#fcc;"      
| 79 || April 12 || Brooklyn
| 
| David West (26)
| Roy Hibbert (10)
| George Hill (10)
| Bankers Life Fieldhouse18,165
| 49–30
|- style="background:#fcc;"      
| 80 || April 14 || @ New York
| 
| Lance Stephenson (22)
| Roy Hibbert (10)
| George Hill (11)
| Madison Square Garden19,033
| 49–31      
|- style="background:#ccc;"
| –
| April 16
| @ Boston
| colspan="7" | Game canceled due to the Boston Marathon bombing.
|- style="background:#fcc;"       
| 81 || April 17 || Philadelphia
| 
| Gerald Green (34)
| Tyler Hansbrough (9)
| Lance Stephenson (6)
| Bankers Life Fieldhouse18,165
| 49–32

Standings

Playoffs

|- style="background:#cfc;"
| 1
| April 21
| Atlanta
| 
| Paul George (23)
| Paul George (11)
| Paul George (12)
| Bankers Life Fieldhouse18,165
| 1–0
|- style="background:#cfc;"
| 2
| April 24
| Atlanta
| 
| Paul George (27)
| Roy Hibbert (9)
| George, West, Hibbert, Hill, & Augustin (3)
| Bankers Life Fieldhouse18,165
| 2–0
|- style="background:#fcc;"
| 3
| April 27
| @ Atlanta
| 
| West (18)
| George, Hibbert, & Hansbrough (9)
| George Hill (3)
| Philips Arena18,238
| 2–1
|- style="background:#fcc;"
| 4
| April 29
| @ Atlanta
| 
| Paul George (21)
| Paul George (12)
| Lance Stephenson (8)
| Philips Arena18,241
| 2–2
|- style="background:#cfc;"
| 5
| May 1
| Atlanta
| 
| David West (24)
| Lance Stephenson (12)
| George Hill (10)
| Bankers Life Fieldhouse18,165
| 3–2
|- style="background:#cfc;"
| 6
| May 3
| @ Atlanta
| 
| West & Hill (21)
| Hibbert & Stephenon (11)
| Paul George (7)
| Philips Arena18,238
| 4–2

|- style="background:#cfc;"
| 1
| May 5
| @ New York
| 
| David West (20)
| Lance Stephenson (13)
| George Hill (6)
| Madison Square Garden19,033 
| 1–0
|- style="background:#fcc;"
| 2
| May 7
| @ New York
| 
| Paul George (20)
| Roy Hibbert (12)
| George Hill (7)
| Madison Square Garden19,033
| 1–1
|- style="background:#cfc;"
| 3
| May 11
| New York
| 
| Roy Hibbert (24)
| Hibbert & West (12)
| Paul George (8)
| Bankers Life Fieldhouse18,165
| 2–1
|- style="background:#cfc;"
| 4
| May 14
| New York
| 
| George Hill (26)
| Paul George (14)
| Paul George (7)
| Bankers Life Fieldhouse18,165
| 3–1
|- style="background:#fcc;"
| 5
| May 16
| @ New York
| 
| Paul George (23)
| David West (10)
| Paul George (6)
| Madison Square Garden19,033
| 3–2
|- style="background:#cfc;"
| 6
| May 18
| New York
| 
| Lance Stephenson (25)
| Roy Hibbert (12)
| George, West, & Hill (4)
| Bankers Life Fieldhouse 18,165
| 4–2

|- style="background:#fcc;"
| 1
| May 22
| @ Miami
| 
| Paul George (27)
| Lance Stephenson (12)
| George Hill (7)
| American Airlines Arena19,679
| 0–1
|- style="background:#cfc;"
| 2
| May 24
| @ Miami
| 
| Roy Hibbert (29)
| Roy Hibbert (10)
| Paul George (6)
| American Airlines Arena20,022
| 1–1
|- style="background:#fcc;"
| 3
| May 26
| Miami
| 
| David West (21)
| Roy Hibbert (17)
| Paul George (8)
| Bankers Life Fieldhouse18,165
| 1–2
|- style="background:#cfc;"
| 4
| May 28
| Miami
| 
| Roy Hibbert (23)
| West & Hibbert (12)
| George Hill (6)
| Bankers Life Fieldhouse18,165
| 2–2
|- style="background:#fcc;"
| 5
| May 30
| @ Miami
| 
| Paul George (27)
| Paul George (11)
| Paul George (5)
| American Airlines Arena19,913
| 2–3
|- style="background:#cfc;"
| 6
| June 1
| Miami
| 
| Paul George (28)
| David West (14)
| George Hill (6)
| Bankers Life Fieldhouse18,165
| 3–3
|- style="background:#fcc;"
| 7
| June 3
| @ Miami
| 
| Roy Hibbert (18)
| Roy Hibbert (8)
| Lance Stephenson (5)
| American Airlines Arena20,025
| 3–4

Player statistics

Regular season

Playoffs

Player Statistics Citation:

Transactions

Overview

Trades

Free agents

See also

References

Indiana Pacers seasons
Indiana Pacers
Pace
Pace